The 2006–07 National Division One was the 20th full season of rugby union within the second tier of the English league system, currently known as the RFU Championship. This season saw the league increased from 14 to 16 teams with new teams including Leeds Tykes (relegated from the 2005-06 Guinness Premiership), as well as Moseley and Waterloo who were promoted from 2005–06 National Division Two.  Other changes saw Exeter Chiefs move from the County Ground to Sandy Park, a modern stadium with room for further expansion, Nottingham moved from Ireland Avenue to groundshare with Notts County at the much larger Meadow Lane and finally Cornish Pirates moved from their temporary ground at Kenwyn in Truro to the larger (and more permanent) Recreation Ground owned by Camborne RFC.

Leeds Tykes bounced back by winning the National Division One title at the first attempt and returned to the Guinness Premiership for season 2007–08. Earth Titans finished in second place, and Otley and Waterloo were relegated to the 2007–08 National Division Two.

Participating teams

Table

Results

Round 1

Round 2

Round 3

Round 4

Round 5

Round 6

Round 7

Round 8

Round 9

Round 10

Round 11

Round 12

Round 13

Round 14

Round 15

Round 16

Round 17

Round 18 

Postponed.  Game rescheduled to 24 March 2007.

Round 19

Round 20

Round 21

Round 22 

Postponed.  Game rescheduled to 4 March 2007.

Round 23 

Postponed.  Game rescheduled to 4 April 2007.

Postponed.  Game rescheduled to 14 April 2007.

Postponed.  Game rescheduled to 24 March 2007.

Postponed.  Game rescheduled to 14 April 2007.

Postponed.  Game rescheduled to 17 April 2007.

Round 24

Round 22 (rescheduled game)

Round 25

Round 26

Round 18 & 23 (rescheduled games)

Round 27

Round 23 (rescheduled game)

Round 28

Round 23 (rescheduled games)

Round 29

Round 30

Total season attendances 

Notes

Individual statistics 

 Note that points scorers includes tries as well as conversions, penalties and drop goals.

Top points scorers

Top try scorers

Season records

Team
Largest home win — 66 pts 
66 - 0 Leeds Tykes at home to Waterloo on 11 March 2007
Largest away win — 62 pts
77 - 15 Leeds Tykes away to Waterloo on 4 November 2006
Most points scored — 77 pts
77 - 15 Leeds Tykes away to Waterloo on 4 November 2006
Most tries in a match — 12 
Leeds Tykes away to Waterloo on 4 November 2006
Most conversions in a match — 9
Doncaster Knights at home to Waterloo on 21 April 2007
Most penalties in a match — 6 (x2)
Sedgley Park away to Coventry on 26 November 2006
Moseley at home to Otley on 27 January 2007
Most drop goals in a match — 2
Newbury at home to Sedgley Park on 24 March 2007

Player
Most points in a match — 32
 Alberto Di Bernardo for Cornish Pirates at home to Moseley on 17 September 2006
Most tries in a match — 5 
 Nicolas Sestaret for Plymouth Albion at home to Moseley on 23 March 2007
Most conversions in a match — 9
 Cerith Rees for Doncaster Knights at home to Waterloo on 21 April 2007
Most penalties in a match —  6 (x2)
 Phil Jones for Sedgley Park away to Coventry on 26 November 2006
 Oliver Thomas for Moseley at home to Otley on 27 January 2007
Most drop goals in a match — 2
 Nick Defty for Newbury at home to Sedgley Park on 24 March 2007

Attendances

Highest — 7,105 
Leeds Tykes at home to Earth Titans on 22 April 2007
Lowest — 308
Pertemps Bees at home to Plymouth Albion on 3 February 2007
Highest Average Attendance — 3,351
Exeter Chiefs
Lowest Average Attendance — 521
Waterloo

See also
 English rugby union system

References

2006–07 in English rugby union leagues
2006–07